The 1990 Utah Utes football team represented the University of Utah as a member of the Western Athletic Conference (WAC) during the 1990 NCAA Division I-A football season. In their first season under head coach Ron McBride, the Utes compiled an overall record of 4–7 record with a mark of 2–6 against conference opponents, placed seventh in the WAC, and were outscored by their opponents 348 to 214. The team played home games at Robert Rice Stadium in Salt Lake City.

The McBride era started with a shutout of Utah State. It was the Utes first shutout since the 1981 season and signaled a change in defensive philosophy from the previous year, in which Utah finished in last place out of 106 NCAA Division I-A teams in total defense.

Schedule

References

Utah
Utah Utes football seasons
Utah Utes football